Time and Time Again may refer to:

Music
"Time and Time Again", the second single from the rock band Papa Roach's second album, Lovehatetragedy
Time and Time Again, a 2006 album by jazz drummer Paul Motian
"Time and Time Again", first track on the album Lines in My Face by Chronic Future
"Time and Time Again", sixth track on the album August and Everything After by Counting Crows
"Time and Time Again", fifth track on the album White Heat by Dusty Springfield
"Time and Time Again", sixteenth track on the album Missing Links by The Monkees
"Time and Time Again", sixth track on the album Especially for You by The Smithereens
"Time and Time Again", a song in the mod Portal Stories: Mel

Novels
Time and Time Again, novel by Dennis Danvers written in 1994
Time and Time Again, novel by Ben Elton written in 2014
Time and Time Again, novel by James Hilton written in 1953

Other
"Time and Time Again", the first short story by H. Beam Piper
Time and Time Again (role-playing game), published by Timeline Ltd. in 1984

See also
Time and Again (disambiguation)
Time Again (disambiguation)